Washington Township is a township in Greene County, Pennsylvania, United States. The population was 1,098 at the 2010 census.

History
The Grimes Covered Bridge and McClelland-Grimes Farm are listed on the National Register of Historic Places.

Geography
The township is in north-central Greene County and is bordered to the north by Washington County.

Interstate 79 passes through the township, with access from Exit 19 at Ruff Creek. Besides Ruff Creek, unincorporated communities in the township include Sycamore and part of Swarts.

Demographics

As of the census of 2000, there were 1,106 people, 409 households, and 328 families residing in the township.  The population density was 41.0 people per square mile (15.8/km).  There were 435 housing units at an average density of 16.1/sq mi (6.2/km).  The racial makeup of the township was 98.73% White, 0.18% African American, 0.09% Native American, 0.09% Asian, and 0.90% from two or more races. Hispanic or Latino of any race were 0.09% of the population.

There were 409 households, out of which 36.4% had children under the age of 18 living with them, 68.2% were married couples living together, 7.8% had a female householder with no husband present, and 19.8% were non-families. 16.9% of all households were made up of individuals, and 7.8% had someone living alone who was 65 years of age or older.  The average household size was 2.70 and the average family size was 3.05.

In the township the population was spread out, with 25.0% under the age of 18, 7.1% from 18 to 24, 27.6% from 25 to 44, 29.2% from 45 to 64, and 11.1% who were 65 years of age or older.  The median age was 40 years. For every 100 females, there were 94.0 males.  For every 100 females age 18 and over, there were 100.7 males.

The median income for a household in the township was $39,432, and the median income for a family was $43,889. Males had a median income of $33,036 versus $21,435 for females. The per capita income for the township was $17,207.  About 7.5% of families and 8.0% of the population were below the poverty line, including 9.2% of those under age 18 and 2.6% of those age 65 or over.

References

Townships in Greene County, Pennsylvania
Townships in Pennsylvania